The Department of Home and Hill Affairs, popularly known as the Home Department, is a West Bengal government department. It is an interior ministry mainly responsible for the administration of the West Bengal National Volunteer Force and Civil-Military Liaison, welfare of military personnel, RIMC admission test, scholarship to RIMC/NDA cadets, World War-II veteran pension, concessions to volunteer-members of Territorial Army, rewards to Gallantry/Distinguished Service Awardees.

Ministerial Team and Senior Officials 
The ministerial team at the Home Department is headed by the Cabinet Minister for Home Affairs, who may or may not be supported by Ministers of State.  The current Minister of Home and Hill Affairs is Mamata Banerjee who is also the Chief Minister of West Bengal.

The department's administration is headed by an IAS officer of rank of either Additional Chief Secretary or Principal Secretary.

References 

Government departments of West Bengal
Year of establishment missing